Thierry Lacrampe (born 23 February 1988) is a French rugby union player. His position is Scrum-half and he formerly played for Section Paloise in the Top 14. He began his career with Tarbes in the Pro D2 before moving to Castres in 2011.

References

1988 births
Living people
French rugby union players
People from Lourdes
Castres Olympique players
ASM Clermont Auvergne players
Rugby union scrum-halves
Sportspeople from Hautes-Pyrénées
Tarbes Pyrénées Rugby players
Section Paloise players